was the 4th-generation head of the Tokugawa Yoshinobu-ke, the branch of the Tokugawa line started by the last Shōgun Tokugawa Yoshinobu.

Biography
Born in Sena, in Shizuoka Prefecture, he went to school in Tokyo, later engaging in a career in photography (incidentally, the hobby of his great-grandfather) and graphic design with Honda. Later a freelance author, he spent his time writing about the history of his family after the Meiji Restoration. He also sold coffee under the brand name Tokugawa Shōgun Kōhī.

Through his mother's side of the family, Yoshitomo is also a descendant of Matsudaira Katamori.

Death
Yoshitomo died on September 25, 2017 in a hospital in Mito, Ibaraki Prefecture at the age of 67.

Principal works

Tokugawa Yoshinobu-ke ni Youkoso. Tokyo: Bungei-shunju, 2003.
Tokugawa Yoshinobu-ke no Shokutaku. Tokyo: Bungei-shunju, 2005.

Ancestry

Patrilineal descent

Tokugawa's patriline is the line from which he is descended father to son.

The existence of a verifiable link between the Nitta clan and the Tokugawa/Matsudaira clan remains somewhat in dispute.

Descent prior to Keitai is unclear to modern historians, but traditionally traced back patrilineally to Emperor Jimmu
Emperor Keitai, ca. 450–534
Emperor Kinmei, 509–571
Emperor Bidatsu, 538–585
Prince Oshisaka, ca. 556–???
Emperor Jomei, 593–641
Emperor Tenji, 626–671
Prince Shiki, ????–716
Emperor Kōnin, 709–786
Emperor Kanmu, 737–806
Emperor Saga, 786–842
Emperor Ninmyō, 810–850
Emperor Montoku 826-858
Emperor Seiwa, 850-881
Prince Sadazumi, 873-916
Minamoto no Tsunemoto, 894-961
Minamoto no Mitsunaka, 912-997
Minamoto no Yorinobu, 968-1048
Minamoto no Yoriyoshi, 988-1075
Minamoto no Yoshiie, 1039-1106
Minamoto no Yoshikuni, 1091-1155
Minamoto no Yoshishige, 1114-1202
Nitta Yoshikane, 1139-1206
Nitta Yoshifusa, 1162-1195
Nitta Masayoshi, 1187-1257
Nitta Masauji, 1208-1271
Nitta Motouji, 1253-1324
Nitta Tomouji, 1274-1318
Nitta Yoshisada, 1301-1338
Nitta Yoshimune, 1331?-1368
Tokugawa Chikasue?, ????-???? (speculated)
Tokugawa Arichika, ????-????
Matsudaira Chikauji, d. 1393?
Matsudaira Yasuchika, ????-14??
Matsudaira Nobumitsu, c. 1404-1488/89?
Matsudaira Chikatada, 1430s-1501
Masudaira Nagachika, 1473-1544
Matsudaira Nobutada, 1490-1531
Matsudaira Kiyoyasu, 1511-1536
Matsudaira Hirotada, 1526-1549
Tokugawa Ieyasu, 1st Tokugawa Shōgun (1543-1616)
Tokugawa Yorifusa, 1st Lord of Mito (1603-1661)
Matsudaira Yorishige, 1st Lord of Takamatsu (1622-1695)
Matsudaira Yoriyuki (1661-1687)
Matsudaira Yoritoyo, 3rd Lord of Takamatsu (1680-1735)
Tokugawa Munetaka, 4th Lord of Mito (1705-1730)
Tokugawa Munemoto, 5th Lord of Mito (1728-1766)
Tokugawa Harumori, 6th Lord of Mito (1751-1805) 
Tokugawa Harutoshi, 7th Lord of Mito (1773-1816) 
Tokugawa Nariaki, 9th Lord of Mito (1800-1860) 
Tokugawa Yoshinobu, 15th Tokugawa Shōgun (1837-1913) 
Yoshihisa Tokugawa (1884-1922) 
Yoshimitsu Tokugawa (1913-1993) 
Yoshitomo Tokugawa (1950-2017)

Notes

References
 Tokugawa, Yoshitomo. Tokugawa Yoshinobu-ke ni yōkoso: waga ie ni tsutawaru aisubeki "saigo no shōgun" no yokogao. Tokyo: Bunshun-bunko, 2005.

Tokugawa Yoshinobu family
1950 births
2017 deaths
People from Shizuoka (city)
Japanese photographers
Honda people
Seijo University alumni